Kráľ is a village and municipality in the Rimavská Sobota District of the Banská Bystrica Region of southern Slovakia.

Genealogical resources

The records for genealogical research are available at the state archive "Statny Archiv in Banska Bystrica,

Slovakia"

 Lutheran church records (births/marriages/deaths): 1730-1895 (parish B)
 Reformated church records (births/marriages/deaths): 1778-1899 (parish B)

See also
 List of municipalities and towns in Slovakia

External links
https://web.archive.org/web/20080111223415/http://www.statistics.sk/mosmis/eng/run.html 
Surnames of living people in Kral

Villages and municipalities in Rimavská Sobota District